The ZIM-12 was a Soviet full-size luxury car produced by the Gorky Automotive Plant (GAZ) from 1950 until 1960. It was the first executive car produced by GAZ and the first one to have the famous leaping gazelle hood ornament. The car was built to serve high and medium rank Soviet nomenklatura, but was also readily available as a taxi and ambulance. Unlike its successors, ZIM was the only Soviet executive class full-size car that was actually made available for private ownership. A total of 21,527 examples were built.

Development

GAZ began the design process for what became the M12 in May 1948, when the Soviet government requested a six-passenger sedan for the niche between the ZIS-110 and the Pobeda, with a deadline of twenty-nine months to produce it. Due to the lack of time, head designer Andrei Lipgart was given a choice between copying an American product (a Buick) or developing an entirely new model. He chose the latter, despite high level support for simply badge engineering a Buick.

The ZIM's compression ratio was increased to 6.7:1, but it was still able to employ the 70 octane petrol (gasoline) common in the Soviet Union; this, plus an improved intake manifold and twin-choke (two-barrel) carburetor, was responsible for the increased power. The front suspension was by coil springs, with leaf springs at the rear, and hydraulic shock absorbers. It had drum brakes at all four corners. Despite lacking power steering, the 18.2:1 ratio steering box made turning fairly easy. It offered a standard three-band AM radio, at a time when radios were not standard on most American cars, even the most expensive ones.

The result was an Oldsmobile-like "bulge". It was also the first GAZ to feature the leaping gazelle hood ornament.

The first car was built in October 1950, and was notionally available to average citizens; its 40,000 ruble price made purchase unlikely (comparing to 16,000 for mid-class Pobeda).

The ZIM abbreviation stands for Zavod imeni Molotova. Prior to 1957, the GAZ factory was officially named as Gorkovsky avtomobilny zavod imeni V.M. Molotova, or the Vyacheslav Molotov Gorky automotive factory, in honour of the Soviet Foreign Minister. All of the models carried the prefix M instead of GAZ. However, for a car of executive class, a new catchy abbreviation was introduced, coinciding with bigger ZIS limousines. In the style of American car fashion that the vehicle was inspired by, the ZIM was used laboriously to decorate the car: the hubcaps, the bonnet, the radiator grille, even the horn button on the steering wheel. However, the Soviet Minister's career was abruptly finished in May 1957, when he lost a political fallout with Nikita Khrushchev. Following his downfall, the country underwent a renaming spree, with cities, streets, ships and factories being hastily rid of the fallen politician's name. ZIM, which was in production, from the summer of 1957 was hurriedly re-christened as GAZ-12, and all of the badges and adornments replaced by the new abbreviation. Moreover, right up until the perestroika the car was officially named labelled only as the GAZ-12, whilst unofficially it was almost exclusively referred to as the ZIM.

A prototype four-door cabriolet was built in 1949, but not produced, due to problems with rigidity. It was also overweight for the engine. An ambulance GAZ-12B was also built in 1951–1960, with folding seats for medics and basically same body; stretchers were loaded through the trunk. There was also a taxi variant GAZ-12A, used mainly as a marshrutka in state-owned inter-city communication, and a draisine designed and built on the ZIM basis for the use on narrow-gauge railways.

The GAZ-12 was replaced by the GAZ-13 Chaika.

Technical specifications

 Clearance: 
 Turn radius: 
 Gearbox: 3 speeds + reverse
 Weight:  ( with full tank, oil and other liquids)
 Maximum speed: 
 Fuel tank: 
 Fuel consumption:  at 50–60 km/h

Notes

Sources
 
 ZIM-12, "Avtolegendy SSSR" Nr.3, DeAgostini, 2009, ISSN 2071-095X 

Cars of Russia
Soviet automobiles
GAZ Group vehicles
Flagship vehicles
Luxury vehicles
Cars introduced in 1950